Mayadin District is a district (mantiqah) administratively belonging to Deir ez-Zor Governorate, Syria. At the 2004 official census, the district had a population of 247,171. Its administrative centre is the city of Mayadin.

Subdistricts
The district of Mayadin is divided into three subdistricts or Nāḥiyas (population according to 2004 official census):

 Mayadin Subdistrict (ناحية الميادين): population 86,091.
 Diban Subdistrict (ناحية ذيبان): population 65,079.
 Al-Asharah Subdistrict (ناحية عشارة): population 96,001.

References

 
Districts of Deir ez-Zor Governorate